Ryan Haynes may refer to:

 Ryan A. Haynes (born 1985), member of the Tennessee House of Representatives
 Ryan Haynes (footballer) (born 1995), English footballer